The Amman National School (ANS) is a private educational institution located in Amman, Jordan. The head principal is Dara Taher.

History

It was established in 1985 and included only junior Grades. The school started with grades 1–3 in a rented building. Two years later, the school moved to its current location in Dabouq for grades KG-5. From then onward, the school added a grade every year. The first graduating class was in 1995. Since then, the school has continued to expand and extra facilities and classrooms have been added to provide more learning space and services. ANS, now, has full enrollment of 800 students from KG-12th grade.

Curriculum

ANS currently offers the Jordanian high school program (Tawjihi) and IB Diploma Program for grades 11–12. IGCSE was also offered at ANS until the end of the school year 2006–2007. ANS offers the Jordanian National Program for grades (1-12). Students can also choose to join an international program starting 9th grade. The school is authorized to give the International Baccalaureate Diploma for grades (11-12).

Accreditation

ANS is accredited by the International Baccalaureate . The school is licensed by the Jordanian Ministry of Education.

Students

The school body stands at 800 students. The majority of students at ANS are Jordanians. The school also includes a diverse expatriate population, with students from Algeria, Cyprus, Egypt, Lebanon, Morocco, Palestine, Syria, Sweden, and Tunisia, and the United States.

External links

 http://www.ans.edu.jo

International schools in Jordan
Private schools in Jordan
International Baccalaureate schools in Jordan
Schools in Amman
1985 establishments in Jordan
Educational institutions established in 1985